Klara Niedertscheider is an Austrian luger who competed in the early 1970s. A natural track luger, she won the four medals in the women's singles event at the FIL European Luge Natural Track Championships with three golds (1971, 1974, 1975) and one silver (1970).

References
Natural track European Championships results 1970-2006.

Austrian female lugers
Possibly living people
Year of birth missing
20th-century Austrian women